Anil and Babu are a director duo. Anil and Babu both individually directed two films before they directed several films together from 1992 to 2004. They worked together for most of their career. While Anil directed nine films after 2004 Babu only directed one. Babu died in 2019.

Filmography

References

Malayalam film directors
Malayalam screenwriters
Indian filmmaking duos
Living people
Indian male screenwriters
Indian screenwriting duos
20th-century Indian film directors
21st-century Indian film directors
Year of birth missing (living people)